Frank Jerry Kostro (born August 4, 1937) is a retired American professional baseball player. The native of Windber, Pennsylvania appeared in 266 games over seven seasons (1962–65; 1967–69) for the Detroit Tigers, Los Angeles Angels and Minnesota Twins of Major League Baseball. Following his big league career, Kostro played in Japan in 1970 for the Hankyu Braves.

He signed with the Tigers in 1956 after attending the University of Michigan and his pro career in North America lasted for 14 seasons. He played multiple positions during his MLB career: 55 games as a third baseman, 38 games as an outfielder, and 14 games each as a second baseman and first baseman. In 1962, he was named an all-star as a utilityman in recognition of his versatility in the Triple-A American Association after batting .321 with 165 hits and 97 runs batted in in 136 games.

His 114 MLB hits included 17 doubles, two triples, and five home runs.

References

External links

1937 births
Living people
American expatriate baseball players in Japan
Augusta Tigers players
Baseball players from Pennsylvania
Birmingham Barons players
Charleston Senators players
Denver Bears players
Detroit Tigers players
Durham Bulls players
Hankyu Braves players
Hawaii Islanders players
Jamestown Falcons players
Knoxville Smokies players
Los Angeles Angels players
Major League Baseball infielders
Michigan Wolverines baseball players
Minnesota Twins players
People from Windber, Pennsylvania
Seattle Angels players
Victoria Rosebuds players
American expatriate baseball players in Nicaragua